Rodniki is a rural locality (a selo) and the administrative center of Rodnikovskoye Rural Settlement, Solikamsky District, Perm Krai, Russia. The population was 1,689 as of 2010. There are 28 streets.

References 

Rural localities in Solikamsky District